Hipólito Reyes Larios (August 13, 1946 – August 8, 2021) was a Mexican Roman Catholic prelate. Reyes served as the first Bishop of the Roman Catholic Diocese of Orizaba in Veracruz from 2000 until 2007. He was then appointed Archbishop of the Roman Catholic Archdiocese of Xalapa, based in the capital city of Veracruz, from 2007 until his death on August 8, 2021. 

He completed his studies at Seminario Regional de Xalapa. Reyes Larios then completed degrees in ascetical theology at the Pontifical Gregorian University and moral theology from the Alphonsian Academy in Rome. He was ordained a Catholic priest on August 15, 1973.

Pope John Paul II appointed Reyes as the first bishop of the newly created Roman Catholic Diocese of Orizaba on April 15, 2000. The bishop was formally ordained on June 13, 2000. He was elevated to Archbishop of the Roman Catholic Archdiocese of Xalapa by Pope Benedict XVI in 2007, a position he held until his death in 2021.

Archbishop Hipólito Reyes Larios died from an internal hemorrhage at a hospital in Xalapa on August 8, 2021, at the age of 74. He died days before his 75th birthday, the mandatory retirement age for Catholic bishops and archbishops.

References

External links

1946 births
2021 deaths
Mexican Roman Catholic archbishops
Mexican Roman Catholic bishops
21st-century Roman Catholic archbishops in Mexico
21st-century Roman Catholic bishops in Mexico
Bishops appointed by Pope John Paul II
Pontifical Gregorian University alumni
People from Xalapa
People from Orizaba